Plectrohyla tecunumani is a species of frogs in the family Hylidae. It is endemic to the Sierra de los Cuchumatanes in western Guatemala. Its specific name refers to Tecun Uman, the Guatemalan national hero. Common name cave spikethumb frog has been coined for it.

Description
The holotype, and the only male in the type series, measured  in snout–vent length. The body is robust, with the head narrower than the body. The supra-tympanic fold is pronounced; the tympanum is distinct in females but indistinct in the male. The skin of the head and body is densely covered with small, round tubercles; tubercles are smaller and less numerous on limbs. There are large tubercles posteroventral to the eye. The fingers are without webbing but have dermal fringes; the toes are two-thirds webbed.

The tail is muscular with relatively narrow fins.

Habitat and conservation
Presumably the adults also range in the surrounding montane pine forest. The tadpoles live in the stream within the cave.

The species is only known from two locations. The type locality has suffered from heavy habitat change; a visit there in 1989 resulted in no specimens, although a single tadpole was found nearby in 1995. Another population was discovered in 2002. The suitable habitat in the area is very limited and mostly degraded. Also chytridiomycosis remains a potential threat. The species is considered "critically endangered".

References 

tecunumani
Endemic fauna of Guatemala
Amphibians of Guatemala
Cave amphibians
Amphibians described in 1984
Taxa named by Jonathan A. Campbell
Taxa named by William Edward Duellman
Critically endangered fauna of North America
Taxonomy articles created by Polbot